Kermanshah may refer to:

Kermanshah, a city in Iran
Kermanshah County, an administrative subdivision of Iran
Kermanshah Province, an administrative subdivision of Iran
Kermanshah, Kohgiluyeh and Boyer-Ahmad, a village in Iran
USS Kermanshah (ID-1473), a United States Navy cargo ship in commission from 1918 to 1919

See also 

 Kerman (disambiguation)